Charidimos (Harry) Demetriou (born 20 August 1958 in London) is a Greek Cypriot-British poker player.

World Series of Poker

Demetriou first became known in poker circles for his 3rd-place finish at the $2,000 no limit Texas hold 'em tournament at the 2002 World Series of Poker (WSOP) won by Layne Flack. Demetriou took home $80,200 for his finish.

He finished in 18th place in the 2004 WSOP Main Event, where he became annoyed with the belligerent attitude of Josh Arieh. Demetriou received $147,500 for his finish in the tournament.

At the 2005 WSOP, he finished as the runner-up in the $2,500 short-handed no limit hold'em event, receiving $163,850 when his Q♣ 9♠ failed to improve in the final hand against Isaac Galazan's K♥ J♠ on a board of 8♦ 5♦ 4♦ 5♠ 2♥. He also made the final table of the same event at the 2006 WSOP, finishing 6th.

Despite his successes at the WSOP, he has made criticisms of disorganisation of events at the 2005 WSOP , the HORSE event at the 2006 WSOP , a change to the format of the 2006 WSOP's shootout event  and a rules decision in the 2006 WSOP main event .

World Poker Tour

Demetriou made the final table of the World Poker Tour (WPT) season 2 Invitational event, finishing in fifth place.

Demetriou made a second WPT final table in season 5, finishing runner-up when his K♥ 6♣ was outdrawn by Stanley Weiss' K♠ 5♦.

Other events

In 2003, Demetriou also appeared in the World Heads-Up Poker Championship and Poker Million.

Demetriou won the inaugural Victor Poker Cup.

As of 2013, his total live tournament winnings exceed $2,100,000. His 10 cashes at the WSOP account for $593,544 of those winnings.

Notes

External links
World Poker Tour Profile
Pokulator 10 Questions Interview

1958 births
Poker players from London
Living people
People from Hendon
British people of Greek Cypriot descent